Donald has been used as a surname. It can be written in Scottish Gaelic as MacDhòmhnaill.

List of persons with the surname
Aaron Donald (born 1991), American NFL football player
Alan Ewen Donald (1931–2018), British diplomat
Alec Donald (1900-1952), Scottish footballer
Allan Donald (born 1966), South African cricketer
Angus Donald (born 1965), English author
Bobby Donald (1894–1962), Australian rules footballer with St Kilda and Essendon in the VFL. 
Caroline Donald, British journalist and author
David Donald (cricketer) (1933–2016), New Zealand cricketer
Elizabeth Donald (born 1975), American author/journalist
Elizabeth Donald (painter) (1858–1940), British/New Zealand painter
Graeme Donald (born 1974), Scottish footballer
Howard Donald (born 1968), British singer
Hugh Paterson Donald (1908–1989), New Zealand-born, British geneticist and researcher on animal breeding
James Donald (1917–1993), Scottish actor
Kenneth William Donald (1911–1994), British physician
Kriss Donald (1988-2004), Scottish murder victim
Larry Donald (born 1967), American professional heavyweight boxer
Luke Donald (born 1977), English golfer
Merlin Donald (born 1939), Canadian psychologist and cognitive neuroscientist
Mitchell Donald (born 1988), Surinamese footballer
Rod Donald (1957–2005), New Zealand politician
Scott Donald (born 1980), Australian professional rugby league footballer
Stephen Donald (born 1983), New Zealand rugby union player
Wally Donald (1927–2003), Australian rules footballer
Warren Donald (born 1964), English-born footballer who played for Northampton Town and Colchester Utd

English-language surnames